Julia C. Lathrop Homes is a Chicago Housing Authority (CHA) public housing project located along the line between the Lincoln Park and North Center neighborhoods on the north side of Chicago, Illinois, United States. It is bordered by the neighborhoods of Bucktown and Roscoe Village. Completed in 1938 by the Public Works Administration, Lathrop Homes was one of the first Chicago public housing projects. Lathrop Homes was placed on the National Register of Historic Places in 2012 and is currently undergoing restoration. Lathrop Homes consists of two-story brick row houses and three- and four-story apartment buildings separated by landscaped courtyards and linked by small archways in a campus-like arrangement. There are a total of 925 units on 35.5 acres of land (approximately three and a half square blocks).

History
Named for social reformer Julia Clifford Lathrop, Lathrop Homes was one of the city's first public housing projects. The homes were built by the Public Works Administration in 1938 and initially leased to the Chicago Housing Authority. The buildings were designed in a Prairie School, Arts and Crafts style with details in a range of styles from Art Moderne to Colonial Revival. The designers were a "dream team" led by Robert S. De Golyer and also including Hugh M.G. Garden, Thomas E. Tallmadge, Vernon Watson, E.E. Roberts, Charles White and Hubert Burnham, with landscaping by Jens Jensen. In 1959, the authority added an 8-story building to house seniors to the south side of the project.

In keeping with the federal neighborhood segregation policy of the time, the development was intended for whites only. As the development matured, it became racially integrated, and has been called "the city's most diverse public housing neighborhood".

Crime and gangs
In recent decades, the Julia C. Lathrop homes have been subject to many of the same problems of increasing crime as other housing projects in Chicago, including narcotics trafficking and gang activity. The housing project was dominated by the Latin Kings street gang.

Proposed redevelopment
In July 2006, the Chicago Housing Authority announced its intention to demolish the Lathrop Homes and redevelop the site. Residents and preservationists protested and Landmarks Illinois developed a plan to renovate the complex as affordable "green" housing. In early 2011, the authority cleared residents from the north end of the development; in November 2011, it awarded the redevelopment contract for the site to a team with experience in architectural preservation and sustainability.  In October 2012, the Chicago Housing Authority approved the demolition of 1800 units including some from Lathrop Homes; however, how many of those demolitions relate to Lathrop Homes and when demolition would begin was not announced.

National Register of Historic Places
In 1994, the Illinois Historic Preservation Agency and the National Park Service determined the Julia C. Lathrop Homes to be eligible for listing on the National Register of Historic Places. In December 2010, the Illinois Historic Sites Advisory Council advised that it be listed. It was listed on the National Register .

References

Residential buildings completed in 1938
Public housing in Chicago
Houses on the National Register of Historic Places in Chicago
Tallmadge & Watson buildings
Public Works Administration in Illinois